Powidz (pronounced  ) is a village in Słupca County, Greater Poland Voivodeship, in west-central Poland. It is the seat of the gmina (administrative district) called Gmina Powidz.

Powidz gives its name to the protected area called Powidz Landscape Park.

From the summer of 2019, Powidz’ nearby 33rd Air Base will be the site of a depot and storage site for US Army combat vehicles in Poland. It will be mostly funded by NATO’s Security Investment Program, and cost around US$210m, with the USA’s component capped at around 20-25%. The US Army Corps of Engineers has made an industry solicitation in 2018 requesting tree-cutting services for  around the base. Two US investments could be sacrificed to pay for President Trump’s border wall with Mexico: A bulk fuel storage facility at US$21m, and a “rail extension and railhead” project budgeted at US$14m.

History
Powidz was granted town rights in 1243 by Duke Bolesław the Pious. It was then part of the Duchy of Greater Poland of fragmented Piast-ruled Poland. Powidz was a royal town of the Polish Crown, administratively located in the Kalisz Voivodeship in the Greater Poland Province of the Polish Crown. The town repelled Teutonic attacks in 1331 and 1454, and received numerous privileges from Polish kings. From the 15th century, Powidz was the seat of local starosts. In the 15th century, a school was created in Powidz, which was subordinate to the Kraków Academy (present-day Jagiellonian University), the oldest and leading university of Poland. The town suffered in the 17th century as a result of the epidemic and the Swedish invasion.

In 1793, as a result of the Second Partition of Poland, it was annexed by Prussia, in 1807 it became part of the short-lived Polish Duchy of Warsaw, and in 1815 it was re-annexed by Prussia. Many residents took part in the Kościuszko Uprising (1794), November Uprising (1830), Greater Poland uprising (1848) and January Uprising (1863), and actively opposed Germanisation attempts. In 1918 local Poles joined the Greater Poland uprising (1918–19), in a successful attempt to re-join Poland, which just regained independence.

During World War II, Powidz was under German occupation from 1939 to 1945. In late 1939 the Germans expelled 80 Poles, farm owners and activists along with their families, to the so-called General Government, and their houses were handed over to German colonists as part of the Heim ins Reich policy.

A Polish Air Force base was built in Powidz after 1953.

Notable people
 , Polish military officer, victim of the Katyn massacre
 , Polish painter
 , Polish military officer during the January Uprising, Franciscan

References

Powidz